Sir Robert Kite was appointed Sheriff of London for 1761 and Lord Mayor of London for 1766. He was knighted on 16 October 1760. He was the last member of the Skinners Company to serve as Lord Mayor until Sir Rupert De la Bère in 1953.

See also
 List of lord mayors of London
 List of sheriffs of London

Notes

References 
 
 Graves, Lucia (2010). History of the Mayoralty cityoflondon.gov.uk

Year of birth missing
Year of death unknown
18th-century lord mayors of London
Sheriffs of the City of London
English knights